József Solti (19 December 1911 — 15 July 1979) was a Hungarian footballer. Born in Szeged, he played for Phöbus FC.

He made his international debut for Hungary on 29 April 1934, scoring twice in a 4–1 win over Bulgaria in Budapest in 1934 FIFA World Cup qualification. His only other appearance was a friendly on 2 April 1939, lost 3–1 away to Switzerland.

References

1911 births
1979 deaths
Hungarian footballers
Hungary international footballers
People from Szeged
Association footballers not categorized by position